The Jews Are Coming (Hayehudim Ba'im) is an Israeli satirical television series. Each episode consists of several sketches on subjects ranging from Biblical facts, to Zionist history and Israeli current affairs, with occasional pop culture references such as a sketch featuring a religion centered on "The Dude". The ensemble cast includes such well-known actors as Moni Moshonov, Ido Mosseri and is directed by long time comedy director Kobi Havia (Domino, Echad Ha'am 1).

The show's opening sequence features two male hands preparing a set of traditional circumcision implements.

Reception 
Season 4 opened with sketches featuring Israeli Prime Ministers Benjamin Netanyahu and Levi Eshkol; Biblical figures Moses and Joseph; Barbie designer Ruth Handler and her family; a trio of unemployed temple priests; and the late Israeli Border Police officer Medhat Youssef, who perished at the height of the Second Intifada. Ariana Melamed of Haaretz wrote that the episode "gives enough explosive material to believers of all sects, loathers of the public broadcasting corporation, and just plain people with fixations... It's an excellent, problematic and limited show, [that] heeds no one."

Nadav Menuchin of Walla! wrote of the final sketch that "[it] was not funny - it was painful, and sometimes that's just what satire is supposed to do - and a smart satire like The Jews Are Coming knows that when needed - you can switch a punch line for a punch in the gut." He adds that the show "succeeds tremendously, since through treatment of materials from the past it manages to be much more acute and relevant in its approach to the Israeli state of mind, than shows that react to current affairs."

Ariel Schnabel of the conservative Makor Rishon notes that the episode received 2.5 million views on digital platforms, "proof that [the show] is influential beyond its time slot." He writes that "the religious-right-wing-liberal is faced with an uneasy dilemma regarding [the show]. On the one hand, it's everything we were taught to despise... on the other - it's just an excellent show... a long conservative nightmare that you can't take your eyes off of, as they're filled with tears of laughter and outrage simultaneously."

Criticism 
The program has elicited criticism from some in Israel who accuse the show of contempt for Jewish tradition and practice. Knesset Member Betzalel Smotrich wrote that the show has "no place in the world," and called to end government funding of the Israel Broadcasting Corporation, which airs the program. Members of the Knesset, including Smotrich, also wrote to Israel's attorney general calling for the show's removal, with MK Moshe Arbel accusing it of causing "severe damage to the religious feelings of many" within Israeli society.

References 

2014 Israeli television series debuts
Channel 1 (Israel) original programming
Israeli comedy television series
Israeli satirical television series
Kan 11 original programming